Roy LaGrone (born 1966) is an American digital media artist. His work, which ranges from large-scale photomontage, animation and video installations, often involve intricate illusions of three-dimensional space constructed from found objects.

LaGrone studied at the Atlanta College of Art (BFA, 1989), and the Savannah College of Art and Design (MFA, computer arts, 2000).

LaGrone’s work has been exhibited at numerous venues including the Smithsonian Institution’s Anacostia Museum; SIGGRAPH; and the Lyndon Baines Johnson Presidential Library and Museum.

References
 Meek, Vicki. Beta Projections and Artifacts from Earth, Art Lies: Contemporary Art Quarterly 53 (Spring 2007), p. 122
 Smithsonian Anacostia Museum, New Visions: Emerging Trends in African American Art (catalog), pp. 12–13
 ACM SIGGRAPH 2003, "Electronic Art and Animation" (catalog), p. 105
 Lyndon Baines Johnson Library and Museum, "Our New Day Begun: African American Artists Entering the Millennium" (catalog), pp. 7, 41, 56

External links
Artist's statement in New Media Caucus journal, Bits Bytes and the Rhetoric of Practice, NMC Media-N: Journal of the New Media Caucus v3.1, August 2007
LaGrone's website

1966 births
Living people
African-American artists
American video artists
American digital artists
Artists from Mississippi
21st-century African-American people
20th-century African-American people